Chanterelle is the common name of several species of fungi in the genera Cantharellus, Craterellus, Gomphus, and Polyozellus. They are among the most popular of wild edible mushrooms. They are orange, yellow or white, meaty and funnel-shaped. On the lower surface, underneath the smooth cap, most species have rounded, forked folds that run almost all the way down the stipe, which tapers down seamlessly from the cap. Many species emit a fruity aroma, reminiscent of apricots, and often have a mildly peppery taste (hence its German name, Pfifferling). The name chanterelle originates from the Greek kantharos meaning "tankard" or "cup", a reference to their general shape.

Description
At one time, all yellow or golden chanterelles in western North America had been classified as Cantharellus cibarius.  Using DNA analysis, they have since been shown to be a group of related species. In 1997, the Pacific golden chanterelle (C. formosus) and C. cibarius var. roseocanus were identified, followed by C. cascadensis in 2003, C. californicus in 2008, and C. enelensis in 2017. C. cibarius var. roseocanus occurs in the Pacific Northwest in Sitka spruce forests, as well as Eastern Canada in association with Pinus banksiana.

The false chanterelle (Hygrophoropsis aurantiaca) has a similar appearance and can be confused with the chanterelle. Distinguishing factors are that false chanterelles have true gills, while chanterelles have folds. Additionally, color can help distinguish the two; the true chanterelle is uniform egg-yellow, while the false chanterelle is more orange in hue and graded, with darker center. The true chanterelle's folds are typically more wrinkled or rounded, and randomly forked. Though once thought to be hazardous, it is now known that the false chanterelle is edible but not especially tasty, and ingesting it may result in mild gastrointestinal distress. The poisonous species in the genus Omphalotus (the jack-o'-lantern mushrooms) have been misidentified as chanterelles, but can usually be distinguished by their well-developed, unforked true gills. Species of Omphalotus are not closely related to chanterelles. Other species in the closely related genera Cantharellus and Craterellus may appear similar to the golden chanterelle.

Cantharellus pallens has sometimes been defined as a species in its own right, but it is normally considered to be just a variety (C. cibarius var. pallens).  Unlike "true" C. cibarius it yellows and then reddens when touched and has a weaker smell.  Eyssartier and Roux classify it as a separate species but say that 90% of the chanterelles sold in French markets are this, not C. cibarius.

Similarly Cantharellus alborufescens, which is very pale, reddens easily, and is found in mediterranean areas and Northern of Iran is sometimes distinguished as a separate variety or a separate species.

Species
An incomplete listing of species that have been called chanterelles includes:
 Cantharellus cascadensis 
 Cantharellus cibarius, which has been split into several species
 Cantharellus cinnabarinus
 Cantharellus enelensis
 Cantharellus formosus
 Cantharellus lateritius
 Cantharellus minor
 Cantharellus roseocanus
 Cantharellus subalbidus
 Craterellus cinereus
 Craterellus cornucopioides
 Craterellus ignicolor
 Craterellus tubaeformis
 Craterellus odoratus
 Gomphus clavatus
 Polyozellus multiplex

Distribution

Chanterelles are common in Eurasia, North and Central America and Africa. They tend to grow in clusters in mossy coniferous forests, but are also often found in mountainous birch forests and among grasses and low-growing herbs. In central Europe, the golden chanterelle is often found in beech forests among similar species and forms. In the UK, they may be found from July through December.

Nutrition
Raw chanterelle mushrooms are 90% water, 7% carbohydrates, including 4% dietary fiber, 1.5% protein, and have negligible fat. A 100 gram reference amount of raw chanterelles supplies 38 kilocalories of food energy and the B vitamins, niacin and pantothenic acid, in rich content (20% or more of the Daily Value, DV), 27% DV of iron, with moderate contents (10-1 of riboflavin, manganese, and potassium (table).

When exposed to sunlight, raw chanterelles produce a rich amount of vitamin D2 (35% DV) – also known as ergocalciferol.

Culinary use

Though records of chanterelles being eaten date back to the 16th century, they first gained widespread recognition as a culinary delicacy with the spreading influence of French cuisine in the 18th century, when they began appearing in palace kitchens. For many years, they remained notable for being served at the tables of nobility. Nowadays, the usage of chanterelles in the kitchen is common throughout Europe and North America. In 1836, the Swedish mycologist Elias Fries considered the chanterelle "as one of the most important and best edible mushrooms."

Chanterelles as a group are generally described as being rich in flavor, with a distinctive taste and aroma difficult to characterize. Some species have a fruity odor, others a more woody, earthy fragrance, and still others can even be considered spicy. The golden chanterelle is perhaps the most sought-after and flavorful chanterelle, and many chefs consider it on the same short list of gourmet fungi as truffles and morels. It therefore tends to command a high price in both restaurants and specialty stores.

There are many ways to cook chanterelles. Most of the flavorful compounds in chanterelles are fat-soluble, making them good mushrooms to sauté in butter, oil or cream. They also contain smaller amounts of water- and alcohol-soluble flavorings, which lend the mushrooms well to recipes involving wine or other cooking alcohols. Many popular methods of cooking chanterelles include them in sautés, soufflés, cream sauces, and soups. They are not typically eaten raw, as their rich and complex flavor is best released when cooked.

Chanterelles are also well-suited for drying, and tend to maintain their aroma and consistency quite well. Some chefs profess that reconstituted chanterelles are actually superior in flavor to fresh ones, though they lose in texture whatever they gain in flavor by becoming more chewy after being preserved by drying. Dried chanterelles can also be crushed into flour and used in seasoning in soups or sauces. Chanterelles are also suitable for freezing, though older frozen chanterelles can often develop a slightly bitter taste after thawing.

References
Footnotes

Citations

Cantharellus
Fungus common names
Edible fungi
Fungi in cultivation
Fungi of Africa
Fungi of Asia
Fungi of Europe
Fungi of Central America
Fungi of North America
Mushroom types